A natural region (landscape unit) is a basic geographic unit. Usually, it is a region which is distinguished by its common natural features of geography, geology, and climate.

From the ecological point of view, the naturally occurring flora and fauna of the region are likely to be influenced by its geographical and geological factors, such as soil and water availability, in a significant manner. Thus most natural regions are homogeneous ecosystems. Human impact can be an important factor in the shaping and destiny of a particular natural region.

Main terms

The concept "natural region" is a large basic geographical unit, like the vast boreal forest region. The term may also be used generically, like in alpine tundra, or specifically to refer to a particular place.

The term is particularly useful where there is no corresponding or coterminous official region. The Fens of eastern England, the Thai highlands, and the Pays de Bray in Normandy, are examples of this. Others might include regions with particular geological characteristics, like badlands, such as the Bardenas Reales, an upland massif of acidic rock, or The Burren, in Ireland.

See also
 Ecoregion
 Natural regions of Chile
 Natural regions of Colombia
 Natural regions of Germany
 Natural regions of Venezuela
 Physiographic regions of the world

References

External links

 Natural regions of Texas
 Alberta's Natural Regions
 Natural regions in Valencia

 
Ecology